Holly McQuillan is a New Zealand designer specialising in zero waste garment design and zero-waste fashion, a field in which she is considered "[one] of the most prominent proponents".  She is senior lecturer in design in the College of Creative Arts at Massey University, and the co-author of Zero Waste Fashion Design with Timo Rissanen. She holds a BDes and an MDes from Massey University and is currently undertaking a PhD in sustainable fashion design practice at the Swedish School of Textiles, in Högskolan I Borås (University of Borås) in Sweden.

McQuillan co-founded Space Between, a green business model for fashion design which acts as a platform for social innovation and enterprise, with Massey University colleague Jennifer Whitty. In 2015, Te Papa acquired a collection of up-cycled garments from the Space Between Fundamentals range for their collection.

In 2015, ObjectSpace in Auckland, New Zealand held a show of her experimental zero-waste and modifiable clothing collection Make/Use. Make/Use is a system for open source, user-modifiable, zero-waste fashion practice.

Publications

References

External links
 at Massey University
  hollymcquillan.com 
Make/Use on the Best Awards website
Holly McQuillan interviewed on RNZ Standing Room Only, 12:40 pm on 12 July 2015
makeuse.nz, the website of the Make/Use project

Living people
Year of birth missing (living people)
New Zealand fashion designers
Massey University alumni
Academic staff of the Massey University